Rainer Küschall (born 17 April 1947 in Flims, Switzerland) is a Swiss tetraplegic, car racer, inventor and designer.

Accident
At the age of 16, Küschall sustained a severe injury to his cervical spine at the level of the C4-C6 vertebrae. At the time, there was no treatment available for quadriplegia, and he spent the following two years bedbound in different hospitals. Küschall then met the neurologist and neurosurgeon Ludwig Guttmann who founded Stoke Mandeville Hospital. Guttmann was the first to place Küschall into a wheelchair and a difficult period of rehabilitation followed.

Career
After many years of rehabilitation and sports, Küschall started his first job as an office clerk in 1976. However, this work proved impossible for him and he left after two weeks. At home, Küschall tinkered around with an old wheelchair and improved it with a few essential changes. This eventually led him to establish Küschall AG. Küschall began serial production of wheelchairs in 1976 – first in his living room, later in a factory. After a severe infection which caused a coma, Küschall sold his company to Invacare, a major medical equipment manufacturer based in the US, in 1996. After several years Küschall recovered and took on the responsibility for engineering and product development as the company's research and development director.

Invention of the monotube designs
Until the 1980s, wheelchairs were heavy vehicles which were almost impossible for the patient themselves to manoeuvre. In 1985, Rainer Küschall designed a completely new wheelchair which only weighed 14 instead of the usual 25 kilograms and had a volume that was 40% smaller. By reducing the weight and adding new adjustment possibilities for seated positions, Küschall increased the range of uses and the mobility of the wheelchair and established the now common monotube design. The product, which he called the Competition (known as Champion 3000 in the USA), was revolutionary at the time and is still one of the most copied basic designs for wheelchairs today. In 1986, Küschall received the award of the Museum of Modern Art. The Competition wheelchair was the first medical device added to the collection at the MoMA and is still exhibited there. One of its successor models weighs only 6.7 kilograms.

Sporting career
Küschall began playing table tennis during his rehabilitation at Stoke Mandeville Hospital in the 1960s and participated in the Summer Paralympics for the first time in 1968. From 1982 onwards, he devoted himself to wheelchair racing and broke the world record for almost every distance on several occasions. By the end of his paralympic sporting career in 1992, Küschall had won 21 paralympic medals and was five times world champion.

In 2002, Küschall bought an AC Cobra 427 which he has been driving ever since as the first Swiss quadriplegic with an international motor racing license.

Notes

External links
 Website of the company
 http://www.rehatreff.de/archiv/2005/2005_02_Kueschall_1005.pdf (PDF-File; 1,8 MB)
 http://www.mandevillelegacy.org.uk/documents/Rainer2.pdf (PDF-File; 0,2 MB)

1947 births
Living people
20th-century Swiss inventors
20th-century Swiss businesspeople
Swiss racing drivers
Swiss male table tennis players
Paralympic table tennis players of Switzerland
Paralympic gold medalists for Switzerland
Paralympic silver medalists for Switzerland
Paralympic bronze medalists for Switzerland
Paralympic medalists in table tennis
Medalists at the 1968 Summer Paralympics
Medalists at the 1972 Summer Paralympics
Medalists at the 1976 Summer Paralympics
Medalists at the 1984 Summer Paralympics
Medalists at the 1988 Summer Paralympics
Medalists at the 1992 Summer Paralympics
Table tennis players at the 1972 Summer Paralympics
Table tennis players at the 1976 Summer Paralympics
Table tennis players at the 1968 Summer Paralympics
Paralympic medalists in athletics (track and field)
Athletes (track and field) at the 1984 Summer Paralympics
Athletes (track and field) at the 1988 Summer Paralympics
Athletes (track and field) at the 1992 Summer Paralympics
Paralympic athletes of Switzerland